The Rouen Nordic Film Festival was a film festival hold in Rouen, France for screening and competition films made in Nordic and Baltic countries, the Netherlands and Belgium.

In December 2010, the organisers, in conflict with the City Council, announce their intention to put an end to the festival.

The Grand Jury Prize
 2010 - : Upperdog (2009), Director: Sara Johnsen
 2009 - : Cold Lunch (2008), Director: Eva Sørhaug
 2008 - : Temporary release (2007), Director: Erik Clausen
 2007 - : Reprise (2006), Director: Joachim Trier
 2005 - : Uno (2004), Director: Aksel Hennie
 2004 - : Falling Sky (2002), Director: Gunnar Vikene
 2003 - : Noi the Albino (2003) ), Director: Dagur Kári
 2002 - : Drift (2001), Director: Michiel van Jaarsveld
 2001 - : 101 Reykjavík (2000), Director: Baltasar Kormákur
 2000 - : Magnetist's Fifth Winter (1999), Director: Morten Henriksen
 1999 - : When the Light Comes (1998), Director: Stijn Coninx
 1998 - : A Wolf Teeth Necklace (1997), Director: Algimantas Puipa
 1997 - : Hamsun (1996), Director: Jan Troell
 1996 - : The Last Wedding (1995), Director: Markku Pölönen
 1994 - : Daddy Blue (1994), Director: René Bjerke
 1993 - : Ingaló (1992), Director: Ásdís Thoroddsen
 1992 - : The Great Day on the Beach (1991), Director: Stellan Olsson
 1991 - : The Birthday Trip (1990) (1990), Director: Lone Scherfig
 1990 - : The Observer (1988), Director: Arvo Iho
 1989 - : The Glory and Misery of Human Life (1988), Director: Matti Kassila
 1988 - : Babette's Feast (1987), Director: Gabriel Axel

References

External links
 

Film festivals in France
Rouen